The list of teams and cyclists in the 2006 Tour de France contains the professional road bicycle racers who competed at the 2006 Tour de France from July 1 to July 23, 2006. In prior years, 21 teams of nine riders each have participated in the annual Tour de France, but following the Operación Puerto doping investigation, the  team as well as four individual riders (Ivan Basso (CSC), Jan Ullrich (TMO), Óscar Sevilla (TMO) and Francisco Mancebo (A2R)) were not allowed to start the race.

Teams

Cyclists

Facts about the riders
 26 countries were represented. France has the most riders, with 36 from the total of 176.
 Bouygues Télécom is only team with all nine riders from the same country.
 Team CSC is only team without rider from the country the team is from (Denmark)
 31 riders who have already completed Giro: Ekimov, Padrnos, Rubiera, Savoldelli, Julich, Lombardi, Sastre, Voigt, Kessler, Calzati, Peña, Cunego, Bruseghin, Tiralongo, Valjavec, Vila Errandonea, Garate, Botcharov, Halgand, Lopez, Parra, Simoni, Lobato, Casar, da Cruz, Larsson, Di Luca, Calcagni, Lefevre, Knees, Sacchi
 11 riders who took part in Giro but abandoned: Honchar, Rogers, Scholz, Rasmussen, Brandt, McEwen, Merckx, Rujano, Moreni, Verbrugghe, Gilbert
 Following a non-start from Jan Ullrich, it is the first time since 1999 that the race has not included a former Tour de France winner.
 Five riders have won Grand Tour: Garzelli (Giro 2000), Simoni (Giro 2001 and 2003), Savoldelli (Giro 2002 and 2005), Cunego (Giro 2004) and Menchov (Vuelta 2005)
 Three riders have won points competition in Tour de France: Zabel (1996 to 2001), McEwen (2002 and 2004) and Hushovd (2005)
 Two riders have won mountains classification in Tour de France: Rinero (1998) and Rasmussen (2005)
 Four riders have won under-25 classification in Tour de France: Salmon (1999), Menchov (2003), Karpets (2004) and Popovych (2005)
 Eleven riders had led the general classification: Vasseur, Zabel, O'Grady, Millar, Moreau, Voigt, Peña, Hushovd, McEwen, Voeckler and Zabriskie.
 Riders who lead the general classification for the first time during the 2006 Tour: Hincapie, Boonen, Honchar, Dessel, Landis and Pereiro.
 At the start, riders who had won a stage in Tour de France: Ekimov, Zabel, Boogerd, Vasseur, Brochard, Mengin, Rous, O'Grady, Bäckstedt, Guerini, Commesso, McEwen, Millar, Dekker, Moreau, Verbrugghe, Voigt, Freire, Halgand, Hushovd, Mayo, Flecha, Sastre, Simoni, Boonen, Pozzato, Moncoutié, Mercado, Zabriskie, Weening, Rasmussen, Valverde, Totschnig, Hincapie, Pereiro and Savoldelli.
 New stage winners during the Tour: Casper, Kessler, Honchar, Calzati, Menchov, Popovych, Fedrigo,  Schleck, and Landis. (Note: Popovych was part of the Discovery Channel team that won the time trial stage in the 2005 Tour de France. However it's his first individual stage victory. There are other riders as well who have been part of winning team in TTT but haven't won an individual stage)

See also
2006 Tour de France
List of teams and cyclists in the 2005 Tour de France

References
http://www.eurosport.com/cycling/tour-de-france/2006/standing_dsc460.shtml (Used for final GC Positions)

2006 Tour de France
2006